Live and Let Live was 10cc's first live album, released in the Autumn of 1977. It was recorded at the Hammersmith Odeon in London between 18 and 20 June 1977 and the Manchester Apollo, Manchester between 16 and 17 July 1977.

Overview
The album featured the new full scale line-up of 10cc after the departure of Kevin Godley and Lol Creme in 1976. The trio of Eric Stewart, Graham Gouldman and Paul Burgess who recorded the most recent 10cc album Deceptive Bends (1977), that was issued earlier that year, were joined by Rick Fenn, Stuart Tosh and Tony O'Malley. Tony O'Malley was also assigned with lead vocals on "Art for Art's Sake".

As the tour promoted Deceptive Bends, the live album features all but one track from it - "I Bought a Flat Guitar Tutor". The rest of the set list relied mostly on Stewart/Gouldman compositions.

Release and reception
The album was a hit, reaching Top 10 in Norway and Sweden and No. 14 in the UK charts and later receiving a Gold certification. The song "The Wall Street Shuffle" backed with "You've Got a Cold" was issued as a single in America, but failed to reach the charts. "I'm Mandy Fly Me" was issued as a single in Australia.

Track listing 
All tracks composed by Eric Stewart and Graham Gouldman, except where indicated.

Side one
 "The Second Sitting for the Last Supper" (Stewart, Gouldman, Kevin Godley, Lol Creme) - 5:22
 "You've Got a Cold" - 3:57
 "Honeymoon with B Troop" - 3:56
 "Art for Art's Sake" - 7:14
 "People in Love" - 4:11

Side two
 "The Wall Street Shuffle" - 4:12
 "Ships Don't Disappear in the Night (Do They?)" - 7:33
 "I'm Mandy Fly Me" (Stewart, Gouldman, Godley) - 6:03
 "Marriage Bureau Rendezvous" - 4:20

Side three
 "Good Morning Judge" - 3:11
 "Feel the Benefit" - 13:35
 "The Things We Do for Love" - 3:49

Side four
 "Waterfall" - 7:48
 "I'm Not in Love" - 6:59
 "Modern Man Blues" - 8:05

Personnel 

 Eric Stewart – lead vocals, guitar, grand piano, electric piano
 Graham Gouldman – lead vocals, bass guitar, guitar
 Tony O'Malley – backing and lead vocals, grand piano, organ, clavioline, Minimoog and Polymoog synthesizers
 Rick Fenn – backing vocals, guitar, bass guitar
 Paul Burgess – drums, percussion, electric piano
 Stuart Tosh – backing vocals, drums, percussion

Charts

References 

10cc albums
1977 live albums
Mercury Records live albums
Albums produced by Eric Stewart
Albums produced by Graham Gouldman